Thomas Charles Horne (born March 28, 1945) is an American attorney, politician, and Republican activist who served as the 25th Attorney General of Arizona from 2011 to 2015. Horne lost to Mark Brnovich in the Republican primary for Attorney General in 2014. He previously served as the Arizona Superintendent of Public Instruction from 2003 to 2011. Horne was elected to another term as Superintendent of Public Instruction in 2022.

Early life and education
Horne was born in Montreal, Quebec. His parents, refugees from Poland, brought him to New York when he was age 4, upon which his parents being naturalized U.S. citizens, Horne, a minor at the time, was also naturalized. He is a graduate of Harvard College (1967) and Harvard Law School (1970).

Legal and business career 
During his 30 years of law practice, Horne served as Special Assistant Attorney General and a Judge Pro Tem in Maricopa County Superior Court and Arizona Court of Appeals. Horne served as a teacher of Legal Writing at Sandra Day O'Connor College of Law and is the author a legal text on construction law published by the State Bar of Arizona. Horne served on the board of the Paradise Valley Unified School District for 24 years, including 10 as board chair.

Horne was the president of T.C. Horne & Co., an investment firm he founded in the late 1960s. After the firm went bankrupt in 1970, Horne received a lifetime trading ban from the Securities and Exchange Commission. The 1973 SEC report alleged that as president of T.C. Horne & Co, Horne "among other things, violated the record-keeping, anti-fraud, and broker-dealer net capital provisions of the federal securities laws and filed false financial reports with the commission." Horne stipulated to an SEC finding that he and his firm "willfully aided and abetted" in violations of securities laws. Horne would later state that these problems stemmed from his attempts to enter into early-on computerization and that he got in over his head while working his way through law school.

Arizona House of Representatives
Horne served in the Arizona House of Representatives from 1997 until 2001. He chaired the Academic Accountability Committee and served as vice-chair of the Education Committee.

State Superintendent of Public Instruction
After 24 years as a school board member and four years as a legislator, Horne served as the elected Superintendent of Public Instruction from 2003 to 2011.

Social studies standards
Among his earliest acts in office was to push for a strengthening of Arizona's social studies standards so that instruction on topics such as the United States Constitution and the Declaration of Independence would be emphasized not only in elementary grades, but reiterated at later grade levels. Under the new standards developed during his administration, second-graders would study ancient civilizations in China and India, as well as how inventions of paper and fireworks in Asia contributed to the development of later civilizations. In September 2006, Horne announced a partnership with History Education and The History Channel to implement a statewide social studies initiative. Funding for the program was $3.7 million. "I am tremendously gratified that The History Channel has recognized the hard work that it has taken to strengthen Arizona's history standards," said Horne.

Full-day kindergarten
Horne was an advocate for full-day kindergarten. Horne said a review of nationwide research on the issue showed that all-day programs appeared to reduce the achievement gap between students from poor households and those from more affluent homes. He also said that children who come to school speaking a language other than English also benefit. "The teachers tell me a substantial number of their students are reading, and they were not able to do that in the half-day program," Horne said. "For students in poor neighborhoods to be reading is a huge step forward to eliminate the fact that when kids are behind when they start, they never catch up."

Nutritional standards
He also pushed for nutritional standards that removed junk food from schools in the elementary grades and created incentives for secondary schools to do so on a voluntary basis. "Most parents want their kids to eat healthy and resent it when the schools undermine that . . . (and have) vending machines full of candy and soda," he said.

Arts standards
Horne, a classically trained pianist and founder of the Phoenix Baroque Ensemble, was an advocate of increasing arts education in schools. "If they're worried about test scores and want a way to get them higher, they need to give kids more arts, not less," said Horne. "There's lots of evidence that kids immersed in the arts do better on their academic tests." Horne continued, "Arts are an essential part of every student's education. Studies show that students who study the arts score higher on academic tests than students not exposed to the arts. The Department of Education needs to ensure that schools have not neglected the arts in order to emphasize the tested subject areas of reading, writing and math."

Testing protocols
Testing protocols were also significantly changed during Horne's administration. He oversaw the development of a dual-purpose assessment that was unique in combining assessments on both state and nationally defined standards. This cut standardized testing time in half, restoring that time to classroom instruction.

Arizona Instrument to Measure Success
Horne also continued to implement the Arizona Instrument to Measure Success (AIMS) test, which was created by Lisa Graham Keegan and approved by the legislature in the 1990s, but did not go into effect until 2006. Despite minor controversy over the requirement that students pass the test before graduating high school, the test became an accepted part of the state education system, until it was replaced in 2014. Horne created an incentive program whereby students who exceeded standards on the AIMS test and met other criteria received tuition scholarships to Arizona's public universities. For a high honors diploma, which guaranteed free tuition at any of Arizona's three universities, a student must have exceeded the standard on the Arizona Instrument to Measure Standards in reading, math and writing in addition to earning a B or better in all 16 core classes and graduate with a cumulative grade point average of 3.5 or be in the top five percent of the graduating class. An alternative was to exceed the standard on two categories on AIMS and get a score of 3 or better on two Advanced Placement or International Baccalaureate tests. "The essence of this action is to support the encouragement of schools and students to strive not just for proficiency but to exceed proficiency," said Horne. "It will be a powerful incentive."

Ban of ethnic studies classes
Horne sought to address curriculum matters as they related to ethnic studies. Horne was alerted to the La Raza (Spanish literal translation, "The Race" meaning "the people") ethnic studies program (Mexican American Studies) in the Tucson Unified School District and, based on a review of the curriculum, championed a law to address what he viewed as the problems these materials presented. A state law was passed that prohibited curricula that either: 1) Promote the overthrow of the United States government. 2) Promote resentment toward a race or class of people. 3) Are designed primarily for pupils of a particular ethnic group. 4) Advocate ethnic solidarity instead of the treatment of pupils as individuals. Horne said, "We think kids should be taught together. They should be taught to treat each other as individuals, that what race they happened to have been born into is irrelevant. What's relevant is what you know, what you can do, what's your character, not what race you happened to have been born into. And we teach the contributions of different groups together in a social studies class for all kids. It's contrary, I believe, to American values to divide kids by race and teach each race only about its own contributions. We want to teach all kids about all different contributions."

Attorney General
On November 2, 2010, Horne defeated Felecia Rotellini in the race for Arizona Attorney General in the 2010 elections.

On August 26, 2014, Horne was defeated in his reelection campaign in the Republican primary by Mark Brnovich. Brnovich defeated Horne by a margin of 54% to 46%.

Arizona v. United States 
Within a few weeks of becoming A.G., his office had filed an appearance in Arizona v. United States, defending the governor and the state against the Obama administration's federal court challenge to S.B. 1070. "My job as attorney general is to defend the state of Arizona," Horne said. The previous A.G., Terry Goddard, had withdrawn from the case, acceding to the demands of Governor Jan Brewer.

Consumer suits 
Shortly after winning the 2010 election, Horne announced that he wanted the office "to do more in the way of consumer protection, even when the cases are small", pursuing violations of the Arizona Consumer Fraud Act. This led to a string of sting operations against auto repair businesses, prompting an offer from an industry group to assist the A.G. in cleaning up the repair business .

$25 billion mortgage settlement 
Horne was involved with other A.G's in several consumer suits. On February 19, 2012, Horne announced Arizona had reached agreement to join a $25 billion agreement with the nation's five largest mortgage servicers over abuse and fraud allegations. Arizona's share was $1.6 billion, with $1.3 billion for underwater (negative equity) homeowners. The settlement was the result of an initiative that included 49 A.G.'s. A similar suit against SunTrust netted $40 million for damaged Arizona homeowners. There was also a separate, Arizona only, settlement with the Bank of America over mortgage practices, which included costs incurred by the A.G.'s office in the lawsuit.

Sirius XM settlement 
A.G.'s in 44 states, including Arizona, and D.C. had sued Sirius XM, alleging that it had engaged in misleading, unfair and deceptive practices. On December 4, 2014, Horne, announced that $230,000 of the $3.8 million settlement would go to affected Arizona consumers.

Pfizer lawsuit 
Horne and other A.G.'s reached an agreement with Pfizer Inc. in 2014, after accusing it of unlawfully promoting Rapamune, an immunosuppressive drug. $721,169 went to Arizona, deposited into the Consumer Fraud Revolving Fund.

United States Supreme Court 
In a 2012 United States Supreme Court case, Arizona v. Inter Tribal Council of Arizona, Inc., Horne argued that Arizona's voter registration requirements were not preempted by the National Voter Registration Act of 1993. The case was decided against Horne and Arizona, by a 7–2 vote. The decision stated "Arizona is correct that the Elections Clause empowers Congress to regulate how federal elections are held, but not who may vote in them. The latter is the province of the states." However, because Horne's predecessor as Attorney General had not appealed an adverse decision by the commission, the case was sent back for a new petition to the commission to be appealed. It was consolidated with a 10th circuit case, which ruled adversely, and the Supreme Court chose not to review a second time. The Court also held that Arizona may petition to have more requirements added to the federal standard.

Firearms regulations 
In 2013 Horne wrote an opinion that defended the state preemption of regulation of firearms; he found that Tucson's city gun laws were unenforceable. In 2012 Horne proposed that a principal or a designee be trained and armed in each school. In 2013, he proposed legislation that would allow teachers to carry guns in public schools.

Same-sex marriage 
Horne threatened to sue the city of Bisbee, Arizona, over a 2013 ordinance recognizing same-sex couples. He withdrew the threat several days later when Bisbee agreed to rewrite the ordinance, removing rights reserved for married couples under Arizona law. In October, 2014, a federal judge ruled that Arizona's law banning gay marriage was unconstitutional, and Horne did not appeal. He felt the chance of it being overturned was "zero," and, added, "I think it is over."

Immigration 

Horne filed a 2013 lawsuit that compelled the Maricopa County Community College District to end its policy of in-state tuition for "dreamers" (undocumented immigrants with federal work permits, who came to the U.S. as children). When accused of being anti-immigrant, Horne responded that he was one himself, being born in Canada. Horne met with students and explained that he was "obligated to enforce the law." Activists held protests and many were arrested. On May 5, 2015, a Maricopa Superior Court judge ruled that "dreamers" could pay in-state tuition rates, ending the two-year lawsuit then A.G. Horne had filed.

Immigration and Customs Enforcement 
Horne criticized the 2014 Immigration and Customs Enforcement (ICE) practice of sending illegal immigrants from Texas to Arizona. "These aliens are not being transported for the purposes of detaining them in a federal facility located in Arizona," Horne wrote, in a letter to the Department of Homeland Security. "Rather, DHS is inexplicably moving them some 1200 miles and simply releasing them here (outdoors in temperatures exceeding 100 degrees) rather than in Texas."

Polygamy 
In 2014 a federal jury awarded a couple living in Colorado City, Arizona, $5.2 million, for religious discrimination. The A.G.'s of both Utah and Arizona intervened in the case. The mostly polygamist towns of Hildale, Utah, and Colorado City, Arizona, and utilities had violated federal and state housing discrimination laws "by discriminating against the Cookes in the provision of services or facilities because of religion." Horne was a long-time critic of the Colorado City police force, known as "the marshal's office." He felt that the marshals were an arm of the FLDS church instead of the law. In 2012 Horne allocated $420,000 to the Mohave County Sheriff's Office to patrol Colorado City. In 2014 he asked for a federal judge to disband the office, after legislation he supported to do so failed to pass. The motion was denied, but, the judge instructed the office to avoid discrimination.

Outlaw Dirty Money Act
In December 2017, Tom Horne and former Phoenix mayor and state Attorney General Terry Goddard created the "Outlaw Dirty Money Act" which would reverse a trend in recent years of hiding the source of political contributions.

Although over 285,768 signatures were submitted to get the initiative on the ballot, conservative groups filed a lawsuit to prevent the citizen initiative from appearing on the Arizona ballot, stating there were not enough valid signatures.

In August 2018, the Arizona Supreme Court ordered that the "Outlaw Dirty Money Act" not appear on the ballot because supporters didn't submit enough valid voter signatures to qualify. Many of the signatures disqualified in the ruling were thrown out because they were collected by 15 paid gatherers who didn't respond to subpoenas requiring them to appear in court for the lawsuit.

Allegations of coordinating with an independent expenditure committee

In October 2012, after an FBI investigation, Maricopa County Attorney Bill Montgomery concluded that Horne deliberately broke campaign finance laws during his 2010 election campaign by coordinating with an independent expenditure committee run by Kathleen Winn. In April 2014, an independent Administrative Law Judge concluded that the prosecution in the case "failed to establish by a preponderance of the evidence" that Horne illegally coordinated with the independent expenditure committee during the 2010 general election campaign for attorney general

In May 2014, Yavapai County Attorney Sheila Polk, to whom that matter had been referred, rejected the administrative judge's recommendation and issued a final administrative decision ordering Horne and Winn to reimburse campaign donors $400,000. Horne and Winn appealed to the Maricopa County Superior Court, which upheld Polk's decision. They then appealed to the Court of Appeals.

On May 25, 2017, the Arizona Supreme Court voided the lower-court decisions, agreeing with Horne and Winn that they were denied due process because Polk was involved in the prosecution's strategy and case preparation. The case was sent back to the Attorney General's Office for a final administrative decision.

On July 5, 2017, Horne was absolved of any wrongdoing by Cochise County Attorney Brian McIntyre, to whom the Attorney General's Office referred the case for the final administrative decision. The final decision in Horne's favor stated: "The record, unfortunately, supports a conclusion that the investigation being conducted was not a search for the truth, but rather, only intended to shore up conclusions already drawn." Horne was vindicated.

Horne's attorney, Dennis Wilenchik, stated he hopes "that this oppressive cloud that has (been) hanging over him since before the last election has gone away. This case was brought by an overzealous prosecutor who chose to act as 'judge, jury and executioner' and to overrule a judge. Justice has finally prevailed for the former Attorney General."

Allegations of campaign finance law violations

On May 5, 2014, an attorney representing a former AG staff member and ex-Horne campaign volunteer, filed a litigation hold letter with the Arizona Attorney General's office, alleging that much of Horne's executive office staff is involved in "substantial campaigning" for his 2014 re-election, "while on state time and utilizing State resources," which, if proven true, could "represent a substantial violation of State and Federal laws which prohibit such conduct"

The allegations first arose in the AG staffer's letter of resignation, which claimed that the office is "not following campaign laws or finance laws," imperiling her "legal well-being." Horne has denied the allegations, calling them a "complete fabrication."

On July 7, 2014, the Arizona Secretary of State's Office released a memo, finding probable cause that Horne violated several campaign-finance laws related to allegations that Horne had employees doing his campaign work on state time, at the AG's office. After investigation, no penalties were imposed.

On March 16, 2016, the Maricopa County Attorney's Office, after examining the allegations for more than a year and determining there was no reasonable likelihood of conviction, closed its investigation of Horne.

Personal life

Horne was married to his wife, Martha, for 47 years. She died in 2019. The couple had five children, one of whom died at age three.

In October 2007, while State Superintendent of Public Instruction, Horne was cited for criminal speeding in Scottsdale, Arizona. During a subsequent year-and-a-half period, Horne was cited for speeding six additional times, including once in a school zone. The criminal speeding charge was settled as a traffic offense.

See also

Arizona Memory Project Video on Histories of Arizona Jewish Residents: Tom Horne Interview
English for Children (Arizona Proposition 203, 2000)

References

Further reading

|-

|-

1945 births
21st-century American Jews
American people of Polish-Jewish descent
Anglophone Quebec people
Arizona Attorneys General
Canadian emigrants to the United States
Harvard College alumni
Harvard Law School alumni
Jewish American people in Arizona politics
Living people
Republican Party members of the Arizona House of Representatives
Politicians from Montreal
Superintendents of Public Instruction of Arizona